The A Shenandoah District is a high school conference of the Virginia High School League which draws its members from the central part of the Shenandoah Valley, as the district name suggests. The schools in the Shenandoah District compete in A Region B with the schools of the A Bull Run District, A Dogwood District, and the A James River District.

Member schools
 Buffalo Gap High School Bison of Swoope, Virginia
 East Rockingham High School Eagles of Elkton, Virginia
 Luray High School Bulldogs of Luray, Virginia
 Page County High School Panthers of Shenandoah, Virginia
 Riverheads High School Gladiators of Staunton, Virginia
 Stonewall Jackson High School (Shenandoah County, Virginia) Generals of Quicksburg, Virginia
 Stuarts Draft High School Cougars of Stuarts Draft, Virginia
 Wilson Memorial High School Green Hornets of Fishersville, Virginia
 Staunton High School Storm of Staunton, Virginia
Virginia High School League